Bouchercon is an annual convention of creators and devotees of mystery and detective fiction. It is named in honour of writer, reviewer, and editor Anthony Boucher; also the inspiration for the Anthony Awards, which have been issued at the convention since 1986. This page details Bouchercon XXVIII and the 12th Anthony Awards ceremony.

Bouchercon
The convention was originally intended to be held in San Francisco, however this was changed to Monterey, California on October 30, 1997; running until the November 2. The event was chaired by Bruce Taylor, owner of "The San Francisco Mystery Bookstore"; and Bryan Barrett.

Special Guests
Lifetime achievement — Donald E. Westlake
Guest of Honor — Sara Paretsky
Fan Guest of Honor — Cap'n Bob Napier
Toastmaster — Julie Smith

Anthony Awards
The following list details the awards distributed at the twelfth annual Anthony Awards ceremony.

Novel award
Winner:
Michael Connelly, The Poet

Shortlist:
Nevada Barr, Firestorm
Linda Grant, Lethal Genes
Margaret Lawrence, Hearts and Bones
Alan Russell, Multiple Wounds

First novel award
Winners:
Dale Furutani, Death in Little Tokyo
Terris McMahan Grimes, Somebody Else's Child

Shortlist:
Michael McGarrity, Tularosa
Charles Todd, A Test of Wills
Michael C. White, A Brother's Blood

Paperback original award
Winner:
Terris McMahan Grimes, Somebody Else's Child

Shortlist:
Harlan Coben, Fade Away
Teri Holbrook, The Grass Widow
Susan Wade, Walking Rain
Steven Womack, Chain of Fools

Short story award
Winner:
Carolyn Wheat, "Accidents Will Happen", from Malice Domestic 5

Shortlist:
Brendan DuBois, "The Dark Snow", from Playboy November 1996
Janet LaPierre, "Luminarias Make It Christmas-y", from Ellery Queen's Mystery Magazine February 1996
Eve K. Sandstrom, "Bugged", from Malice Domestic 5

Critical / Non-fiction award
Winner:
Willetta L. Heising, Detecting Women 2: Reader's Guide and Checklist for Mystery Series Written by Women

Shortlist:
Ron Miller, Karen Sharpe, Mystery!: A Celebration: Stalking Public Television's Greatest Sleuths
Barbara Reynolds, The Letters of Dorothy L. Sayers 1899–1936: The Making of a Detective Novelist
Jean Swanson, Dean James, By A Woman's Hand: A Guide to Mystery Fiction by Women
Steven Womack, Chain of Fools

Fanzine / Magazine award
Winner:
The Armchair Detective

Shortlist:
Deadly Pleasures
Mystery & Detective Monthly
Mystery Readers Journal
Mystery Scene

References

Anthony Awards
28
1997 in California